Forevher (stylized in lowercase) is the second studio album by British musician Shura. It was released on 16 August 2019 by American independent record label Secretly Canadian. The album follows Shura's critically acclaimed debut album, Nothing's Real (2016). The album artwork of Forevher is a reference to the 1882 marble sculpture The Kiss, by French sculptor Auguste Rodin.

The album was preceded by three singles: "Bklynldn", "Religion (U Can Lay Your Hands on Me)" and "The Stage". "Religion" was supported by a music video; directed by Chloe Wallace.

A deluxe edition of the album was released on 26 March 2021, which contained three new tracks, one demo previously released on Bandcamp in 2020 and five acoustic versions of songs that appeared on the standard edition. A music video was released on 17 February 2021 to accompany one of the deluxe tracks "Obsession".

Composition 
Forevher has been described as spacey, super-melodic, immaculately produced pop. It is primarily an electropop and pop record featuring elements of R&B, funk, psychedelic pop, and soul.

Critical reception
Forevher received critical acclaim from music critics. At Metacritic, the album received an average score of 83, based on 15 reviews. Aimee Cliff of Pitchfork stated that Forevher is "looser, livelier and more ecstatic than her debut, detailing the headlong rush of falling in love"; whilst also noting "string flutters mimicking skipped heartbeats, and basslines settling into deep, well-worn grooves." Callum Bains of PopMatters viewed Forevher as an "enjoyably varied album of catchy dance songs, summer jams, and introspective ballads." John Murphy of musicOMH described the sound of the album as "laid-back funk", concluding that the album "is the sound of a woman happy, in love, and going from strength to strength as a songwriter". Writing for NME, El Hunt comments that the record "queers up and skewers the traditional love song, beautifully articulating the giddiness of romance", adding that it "has the feel of a wonkily altered classic, drifting from warm blue pop that colours the sleeve, to quieter interludes." Sophia Simon-Bashall of The Line of Best Fit remarked that the record is "equally insular and nostalgic", adding that the content "feels like an endless dreamscape". They conclude that "Shura has created something hopeful and delightfully light" in Forevher, "setting it apart from much of pop's current offerings."

Accolades

Track listing
 All tracks produced by Shura and Joel Pott.
 All track titles are stylized in all lowercase, except track 5, whose title is stylized in all uppercase.

Personnel 
Credits are adapted from the liner notes of Forevher.

Musicians 

 Shura – synths ; programming ; vocals ; piano ; guitar ; percussion 
 Joel Laslett Pott – guitar ; synths ; programming ; backing vocals ; percussion ; piano ; synth bass ; mellotron ; wurlitzer 
 Luke Saunders – synths ; guitar ; backing vocals 
 Liam Hutton – drums 
 Axel Ekermann - bass 
 Rosie Lowe - backing vocals 
 Kerry Leatham - backing vocals 
 Reva Gauntlett - backing vocals 
 Pauline Le Mell - backing vocals 
 Daniel Moyer - programming 
 Peter Gordon - saxophone 
 Jonny Pilcher - strings arrangement ; piano 
 Will Miller - trumpet / horn arrangement 
 Jono Ma - synths ; percussion 
 Orlando Higginbottom - piano

Technical 

 Shura – production 
 Joel Laslett Pott – production ; recording engineering 
 Daniel Moyer - recording engineering 
 Jono Ma - recording engineering ; additional production 
 Tom Archer - production assistance 
 Jamie McEvoy - production assistance 
 Marta Salogni - mixing 
 Heba Kadry - mastering 
 Nathanael Graham - assistance (tape recording)

Artwork 

 Hollie Fernando – photography
 Ellen Blocksidge - modelling
 Milly Cope - modelling
 Katie Evans - printing
 Miles Johnson - design

Charts

References 

2019 albums
Shura (English singer) albums
Secretly Canadian albums